Erskine Ramsay (September 24, 1864 – August 15, 1953) was an Alabama industrialist.

Biography
He was born September 24, 1864 in Allegheny County, Pennsylvania. His family came from Dunfermline, Fife, Scotland the same town as Andrew Carnegie. Erskine Ramsay's father, a mining engineer, followed Carnegie to Pittsburgh hearing of his success there. The younger Ramsay started working in cooperative store at the mines as a teenager. In 1882, he attended Saint Vincent College, Latrobe, Pennsylvania, at the Senior level, graduating at the head of his class, with little previous formal education. He switched to the mining operations side and was quickly advanced being focused on productivity. He was hired away from Pennsylvania in his twenties to fill a managerial post at Tennessee Coal & Iron. He came to Birmingham in 1887 to run the Pratt Mines, where he invented the rotary coal dump, swivel coupling, and many other innovations, eventually holding over 40 patents, according to industry journal Coal Age.

From there Ramsay advanced to increasingly senior positions within the company. With a group of investors he took over and managed Pratt Consolidated Coal.

A key figure in the development of Birmingham, Alabama, he also donated $100,000 to Auburn University, the largest single contribution at that time (ca 1925), and the Erskine Ramsay Engineering Hall (1925) was one of the results.

Ramsay served as president of the Birmingham Board of Education from 1922 to 1941. In 1930, the city's newest high school was named Erskine Ramsay Technical High School. Today it is known as Ramsay High School.

He was awarded the William Lawrence Saunders Gold Medal in 1937 by the American Institute of Mining and Metallurgical Engineers for improving the manufacturing of coke.

He began opening bank accounts for males named for him, and did this for African American Erskine Hawkins.  Hawkins became a trumpeter and bandleader and helped create the hit song "Tuxedo Junction." Hawkins is buried in the same cemetery as Ramsay.

Erskine Ramsay died August 15, 1953, in Birmingham, and is buried there alongside his brother Andrew Carnegie Ramsay in Elmwood Cemetery (Block 16).

References 
Alabama Hall of Fame: Erskine Ramsay

External links
Sloss Industries History Page
Sloss Furnaces website

Businesspeople from Birmingham, Alabama
American manufacturing businesspeople
Auburn University people
1864 births
1953 deaths
Burials at Elmwood Cemetery (Birmingham, Alabama)